Dembo M. Badjie (born 1952) is a retired Gambian civil servant and diplomat. He entered the Gambian Government in 1970, taking a break to study Political Science and Economics at Rust College, followed by postgraduate studies at Glasgow Caledonian University. He reentered the civil service in 1978, serving in several ministries, including local government and education. In 1983, he had a daughter, Fatim Badjie, who is also a Gambian politician. 

He eventually joined the foreign service, serving as the first secretary of the Gambian embassy in Brussels and the Gambian mission to the United Nations. He became Ambassador to Sierra Leone in 2004. 

In 2010, he was moved to be the Gambian ambassador to India (also serving Bangladesh and Myanmar), in 2010, before entering the Gambian embassy in China in 2016, after the resumption of diplomatic relations between the two countries. 

In 2017, he retired and wrote a book, Outlook on Governance & Administration in The Gambia.

References 

Gambian diplomats

1952 births
Living people